Brandon Rusnak (born Brandon Watson on July 11, 1995) is an American football cornerback for the Arlington Renegades of the XFL. He played college football for University of Michigan.

Professional career
Rusnak signed with the Jacksonville Jaguars as an undrafted free agent. He was later signed to the practice squad before being promoted to the active roster.

On August 31, 2021, Rusnak was waived by the Jaguars and re-signed to the practice squad the next day. He was promoted to the active roster on December 28.

On August 29, 2022, Rusnak was waived by the Jaguars.

Rusnak signed with the Arlington Renegades of the XFL on March 7, 2023.

Personal
Rusnak was born Brandon Watson, but legally changed his name to Brandon Rusnak in November 2020.

References

External links
Jacksonville Jaguars bio
Michigan Wolverines bio

1995 births
Living people
Players of American football from Wilmington, Delaware
American football cornerbacks
Michigan Wolverines football players
Jacksonville Jaguars players
Arlington Renegades players